Massimiliano Messieri (born 1964 in Bologna, Italy) is a musician and scholar with a doctorate in composition, electronic music, and violoncello. He was selected to take part in specialization courses in composition at the Music Academy of Fiesole held by G. Manzoni (1991–1992) and at the Academie d’Eté of the IRCAM held by 
T. Murail and P. Manoury (Paris, 1993–1994).

Interests
Messieri is interested in contemporary arts, and has focused his music research in particular on the interaction among these arts. He has composed several ballets with the Chorea Dance Company, including Espressione I (Bologna, 1994), Quintetto (Bergamo, 1994), Tarkìz (Bologna, 1995), and Cabaret Selvaggio (Milan, 1999) with the Pierpaolo Koss Dance Company.

Main Works
1988 6 Miniature for clarinet and piano

1990 Metamorfosi for solo piano

1991 La rosa del deserto ballet in 6 pictures for female voice, instrumental group and live electronics

1992 Hauptweg und nebenwege for symphony orchestra, piano and live electronics

1993 Espressione I for alto sax, live electronics and tape

1994 ...Ans torn... for soprano and flute

1995 Les rêves de la couleur for large orchestra and tape

1996 Vita lux erat for alto sax and percussions

1997 Virus double concerto for violin, piano and symphony orchestra

1998 Don Giovanni il dissoluto redento Tafel Opera for solos, video installations (artist Daniela Carati), ensemble, live electronics, digital tape and guests

1999 Cabaret selvaggio seven musical pictures for 5 dancers and digital tape

2000 Leonids’ play for 5 audio CDs and 10 speakers

2001 La femme battue IX capriccio per violoncello solo (dall’opera Zadig, 21 capricci)

2002 Sojourn in Leipzig – Portraits 12 portraits for cello and piano

2003 Die Märchenprinzfantasien for alto saxophone and digital tape

2004 Gretchens Träum melodrama in one act for 4 actresses, 2 saxophones, live electronics and digital tape

2005 Das Klangkarussell for solo piano

2006 Jack in the box – La scatola magica di Mefisto chamber delirium suite, loosely based on the homonymous story by Fabrizio Boggiano, for musician, video projections, saxophone (soprano and alto), digital audio and live electronics

2007 am Kreuzweg deiner Sinne duo for clarinet and piano

2008 Forever for soprano saxophone, triangle and live electronics

2009 Piuma di cielo for flute, violin, cello, harp and piano

2010 Quartetto No.2 for string quartet

2011 Fantasia for Xiao Dong Wei fantasy for erhu and ensemble

2012 Liriche Sacre eleven verses from the Old Testament for alto and string quartet

2013 Hot Strings II (new version) capriccio for four harps

2014 Land prelude for four harps

2015 A.H. fantasy for three cellos, conductor, interactive system and live electronics

2016 ALICE opera in 2 acts

2017 Nel mezzo del cammin di nostra vita small fantasy for string orchestra, triangle and piano

2018 BET concerto grosso for soprano, 4 cellos and violoncello orchestra

2019 TAV psalm for 4 percussionists and electronics

2020 12 Haiku for solo piano

2021 Fantasia Concertante for piano and string orchestra

Main Commissions
In 1997, the International Festival Italian Mozart Association (IFIMA) in Rovereto commissioned him, under the aegis of the Internationale Stiftung Mozarteum Salzburg, the work Don Giovanni, the redeemed rake (1998).

In 2000, the National Research Institute for Material Physics (INFM) commissioned Messieri, for the INFMeeting 2000, to write the work Leonids’ Play (composition for 5 magnetic tapes based on the real sound of the Leonids provided by NASA).

In 2004, Messieri was commissioned to compose the opera Gretchens Traum, performed at the Ettersburg Castle in Weimar, Germany.

in 2008, Xiao Dong Wei commissioned him Capriccio for Xiao Dong for solo erhu, which will be played in 2013 in the version for ehru and ensemble (Fantasia for Xiao Dong Wei) for ArtX Detroit at the Max M. Fisher Music Center, Detroit (Xiao Dong Wei, erhu; DSO Chamber Ensemble and Yuki Mack, piano)

In 2012, the Cracow Philharmonic String Quartet commissioned him Liriche Sacre (eleven verses of the Old Testament for alto and string quartet) that it is played the same year at the Cracovia Sacra Festival (Church of the Sacred Heart of Jesus, 15 August 2012).

In 2018 the Mascagni Conservatory of Music in Livorno dedicates him a concert for the "Suoni Inauditi" International Festival, commissioning him Salmo XLIII, lyric for soprano, male chorus, baritone saxophone and live electronics (Elena Tereshchenko, soprano; Valerio Barbieri, saxophone; Maestro Gabriele Micheli, conductor); in the same year Nicola Baroni commissioned him BET (Concerto grosso for soprano, 4 cellos and violoncello orchestra) for the Modern Festival of the Teatro Comunale in Bologna,

CDs
He recorded with Duo Messieri/Selva two audio CD's: "Noises X" (Drycastle Records, 2007) and "MA$KEN" (Drycastle Records, 2009).

In 2017, he recorded with his friend Nicola Baroni, for the record label Amadeus Arte, "Zadig" 21 Capricios for solo cello (also hypercello), where Nicola Baroni also writes the Max/Msp System for hypercello.

In 2020 during the Covid pandemic, Messieri writes a series of compositions for solo piano, and a year later they are recorded on "Islands" Cd by Patrizia Romanello for the Amadeus Arte Label.

External links
Massimiliano Messieri

1964 births
Living people
Musicians from Bologna
Italian composers
Italian male composers
Contemporary music